Karapet Muradyan (born 2 September 1983), best known as Karo Murat, is a German Armenian professional boxer who held the IBO light-heavyweight title in 2018. At regional level, he held the European super-middleweight title from 2008 to 2009 and the light-heavyweight version in 2017.

Boxing career

Early professional career
Murat made his professional debut in Hessen, Germany on 23 September 2006 defeating Matus Sestak. Three more fights during his debut year resulted in three more wins including a victory in Austria on 18 November. A very busy 2007 saw Murat fight another eleven times again winning on each occasion and travelling to Russia, Spain, Austria and Switzerland and well as fighting a number of times in Germany. Of his victories during the year, of particular note were wins over Jermain MacKay on 18 August 2007 at the Max-Schmeling-Halle in Berlin and Emiliano Cayetano at the Seidensticker Halle in Bielefeld on 29 December 2007. Both fighters had boasted only one defeat so far in their careers with Mackay and Cayetano both former Caribbean champions.

European super middleweight champion
On 16 February 2008, in his first fight of the year, Murat defeated Sergey Kharchenko at the Nuremberg Arena to lift the EBU-EE super middleweight title via stoppage in the 10th round. In his next fight, Murat travelled to Neubrandenburg to fight for the full European belt against Cristian Sanavia on 12 April 2008, winning with a 12-round unanimous decision. A first defence in Bielefeld on 20 September 2008 resulted in a majority points win over Spain's Gabriel Campillo before meeting Sanavia again on 28 February 2009. The re-match again in Neubrandenburg saw Murat once again come out on top, this time stopping Sanavia in the 10th round and registering a second successful defence of the title.

Light heavyweight
Having achieved success at super middleweight, Murat moved up to light heavyweight and fought Serhiy Demchenko to win the vacant WBO light heavyweight title via unanimous decision on 29 August 2009 in Halle. His first defence against Guyana's Sean Corbin resulted in a second round stoppage win on 30 January 2010. Murat successfully defended his title once more on 1 May 2010 beating Tommy Karpency over 12 rounds, knocking him down in the second, in Oldenburg, Germany. On 18 September 2010 Murat faced Nathan Cleverly in a WBO light heavyweight title eliminator, losing for the first time in his career by a tenth-round TKO. The bout was waved off by the referee as the 10th round was about to commence, following a doctor's inspection in the corner between rounds. There were no bruises or blood on Karo's face and he was instantly furious at the referee's poor decision. He rebounded from the defeat on 12 February 2011 with an eight-round points win over Christian Cruz and followed this on 7 May 2011 winning the IBF version of the Inter-continental title against American boxer Otis Griffin with an 11th round stoppage. He made his first defence of the title in a rematch against Spaniard Gabriel Campillo on 1 October 2011 in a fight which was also billed as an IBF title eliminator with the fighters earning a draw, the first of Murat's career. Murat then faced the IBF light heavyweight champion Bernard Hopkins on 26 October 2013 in Atlantic City, and lost by unanimous decision. On 1 July 2017, Murat upset the previously undefeated Dominic Bösel (24–0) with an eleventh round TKO and won the vacantEBU light heavyweight title. Murat defeated Travis Reeves by TKO in the 12th round to win the vacant IBO light heavyweight title on 24 March 2018.

Professional boxing record

References

External links
 
 
 

1983 births
Living people
Armenian male boxers
German male boxers
Sportspeople from Yerevan
International Boxing Organization champions
Light-heavyweight boxers
German people of Armenian descent
Armenian emigrants to Germany